Death was an American death metal band from Altamonte Springs, Florida. Formed in late 1983 under the name Mantas, the group originally consisted of guitarist and vocalist Chuck Schuldiner, second guitarist Frederick "Rick Rozz" DeLillo, and drummer and vocalist Barney "Kam" Lee. The band went through many personnel changes during its tenure, before disbanding in December 2001 upon Schuldiner's death. The final lineup of Death featured Schuldiner on guitars and vocals, Shannon Hamm on guitars, Richard Christy on drums (both since 1996), and Scott Clendenin on bass (from 1996 to 1997, and since 1998).

History

1983–1987

Chuck Schuldiner formed Mantas in late 1983 with drummer/vocalist Kam Lee and guitarist Rick Rozz. The band recorded its first rehearsal demo in early 1984, which is known unofficially as Emotional. The recording featured a temporary bassist called Dave Tett, who left after just a few rehearsals and was the band's only bassist during its tenure as Mantas. The group released its first official demo, Death by Metal, in the summer of 1984. In September, the band briefly broke up for "two or three weeks", and returned in October under the new name of Death. Reign of Terror was recorded later that month.

Shortly after the recording of the Infernal Death demo in March 1985, Rozz left Death; Schuldiner and Lee recorded Rigor Mortis the next month. During the summer, guitarist Matt Olivo and bassist Scott Carlson joined the band, however after Lee left and they struggled to find a replacement, the pair left after just a few months. In September, Schuldiner relocated to San Francisco, California and built a new Death lineup with bassist Erik Meade and former D.R.I. drummer Eric Brecht. The trio released Back from the Dead in October, before both new members left in December and Schuldiner returned to Florida.

Death took a brief hiatus in early 1986, while Schuldiner briefly rehearsed with Canadian group Slaughter. In March, the guitarist and vocalist moved to San Francisco again, where he formed a new incarnation of Death with drummer Chris Reifert. Working as a two-piece, with Schuldiner handling bass duties, the group issued the demo Mutilation in April, which led to the band signing a deal with Combat Records. In November the band recorded its debut full-length album, Scream Bloody Gore, which was issued the following May. Before the album's release, the duo was briefly joined by second guitarist John Hand.

1987–1992
Around the time of the release of Scream Bloody Gore, Schuldiner moved back to Florida without Reifert, who opted to stay in San Francisco. He subsequently enlisted former guitarist Rick Rozz along with bassist Terry Butler and drummer Bill Andrews from Massacre for a new incarnation of Death. The group issued Leprosy in 1988, however Butler did not feature on the album and bass was instead performed by Schuldiner. During the subsequent touring cycle, Rozz was dismissed from Death and temporarily replaced by Cynic's Paul Masvidal for a handful of Mexican shows.

After "a few weeks" with Mark Carter, the band was joined by guitarist James Murphy in the summer of 1989. Spiritual Healing was recorded at the end of the year and released the following February. During the subsequent tour, Murphy was fired and the guitarist role changed a number of times – first, Masvidal returned to complete a run of shows in April 1990, before Evildead's Albert Gonzales took over for shows between August and October. When Schuldiner refused to perform in Europe at the end of the year due to poor management and organization of the tour, the remaining members completed the tour without him, using members of the road crew as stand-ins.

Schuldiner parted ways with Butler and Andrews after their tour without him, and in April 1991 he returned to record Human with Masvidal, Sadus bassist Steve Di Giorgio, and Masvidal's Cynic bandmate Sean Reinert on drums. Di Giorgio was unable to commit to the band full-time due to commitments with Sadus, so he was replaced on the subsequent touring cycle by Scott Carino. In spring 1992, Death was forced to cancel a run of shows in the UK due to financial issues.

1993–2001
In early 1993, Schuldiner reunited with bassist Steve Di Giorgio to record Individual Thought Patterns, which also featured King Diamond guitarist Andy LaRocque and former Dark Angel drummer Gene Hoglan. LaRocque was unable to commit full-time to Death, so he was replaced for European festivals in the spring and a US tour in the summer by Ralph Santolla. For a European run later in the year, Forbidden's Craig Locicero took over when Santolla returned to his main band Eyewitness.

By early 1995, Di Giorgio had left Death and LaRocque had confirmed his inability to return, which led Schuldiner to add bassist Kelly Conlon and guitarist Bobby Koelble in time for the recording of Symbolic. After the album's release, the group performed at several European festivals, before Conlon was dismissed and replaced for subsequent tour dates by Brian Benson. Early the next year, Schuldiner announced the temporary disbandment of Death and the formation of Control Denied, following a disagreement with Roadrunner Records. The new group featured vocalist B.C. Richards, guitarist Shannon Hamm, bassist Benson and drummer Chris Williams.

Death returned in the summer of 1997, with Control Denied members Hamm, Scott Clendenin (who by that time had replaced Benson on bass) and Richard Christy (the replacement for drummer Williams) featuring in the new incarnation of the band. This lineup issued The Sound of Perseverance, Death's final studio album, in 1998. After a tour promoting the album, Schuldiner returned to focus on recording the second Control Denied album. However, in 1999 he was diagnosed with pontine glioma, for which he underwent surgery in January 2000. Despite initially improving, Schuldiner's condition worsened in 2001, and on December 13 he died. Shortly before his death, the band issued its first two live albums.

Members

Timelines

Members

Lineups

References

External links
Chuck Schuldiner official website

Death